The following are the Pulitzer Prizes for 1967.

awards

Public Service 

good afternoon :
The Milwaukee Journal, for its successful campaign to stiffen the law against water pollution in Wisconsin, a notable advance in the national effort for the conservation of natural resources.
 Louisville Courier-Journal, for its successful campaign to control the Kentucky strip mining industry, a notable advance in the national effort for the conservation of natural resources.
Local General or Spot News Reporting:
 Robert V. Cox of the Chambersburg Public Opinion (Pennsylvania), for his vivid deadline reporting of a mountain manhunt that ended with the killing of a deranged sniper who had terrorized the community.
Local Investigative Specialized Reporting:
 Gene Miller of The Miami Herald, whose initiative and investigative reporting helped to free two persons wrongfully convicted of murder.
National Reporting:
 Stanley Penn and Monroe Karmin of The Wall Street Journal, for their investigative reporting of the connection between American crime and gambling in the Bahamas.
International Reporting:
 R. John Hughes of The Christian Science Monitor, for his thorough reporting of the attempted Communist coup in Indonesia in 1965 and the purge that followed in 1965-66.
Editorial Writing:
 Eugene Patterson of the Atlanta Constitution, for his editorials during the year.
Editorial Cartooning:
 Patrick Oliphant of The Denver Post, for "They Won't Get Us To The Conference Table... Will They?", published February 1, 1966.

Photography:
 Jack R. Thornell of the Associated Press, New Orleans bureau, for his picture of the shooting of James Meredith in Mississippi by a roadside rifleman.

Letters, Drama and Music awards

Fiction:
 The Fixer by Bernard Malamud (Farrar).
Drama:
 A Delicate Balance by Edward Albee (Atheneum).
History:
 Exploration and Empire: The Explorer and the Scientist in the Winning of the American West by William H. Goetzmann (Knopf).
Biography or Autobiography:
 Mr. Clemens and Mark Twain by Justin Kaplan (Simon & Schuster).
Poetry:
 Live or Die by Anne Sexton (Houghton).
General Non-Fiction:
 The Problem of Slavery in Western Culture by David Brion Davis (Cornell University Press).
Music:
 Quartet No. 3 by Leon Kirchner (Associated Music Publishers), first performed by the Beaux Arts Quartet in The Town Hall, January 27, 1967

References

External links
 

Pulitzer Prizes by year
Pulitzer Prize
Pulitzer Prize
Pulitzer Prize